The Hardangervidda Natursenter  is a museum and visitor center at Hardangervidda National Park in Vestland county,  Norway. The nature centre is located in the village of Øvre  in the municipality of Eidfjord. It is accessible off  Norwegian National Road 7.
It is situated at the foot of Vøringsfossen and the ascent to Måbødalen.

The nature center was opened on 28 May 1995. It was authorized as a national park center for the Hardangervidda National Park in 1997. Exhibitions in the center are spread over three floors of the facility. The centre underwent major creative overhaul in 2018 with exhibitions developed by Sarner International Ltd in London.

References

External links
 Official site Eidfjord  
 Hardangervidda Natursente Eidfjord
 Hardangervidda Natursente Tinn

Museums in Vestland
Natural history museums in Norway
Eidfjord
Nature centers